Sir Osbern Pentecost (died 1054) was a Norman knight who followed Edward the Confessor to England upon Edward's return from exile in Normandy in 1041.

He was one of the few Norman landholders in England prior to the Norman Conquest of England in 1066. Under the patronage of Ralph the Timid, Earl of Hereford, Osbern built the castle at Ewyas in Herefordshire, one of the first Motte and Bailey types to be constructed in England.

On the return from exile in 1052 of Godwin, Earl of Wessex, the Normans were banished from England. Osbern obtained a safe passage from Leofric of Mercia and ventured north to join the court of Mac Bethad mac Findlaích, King of Scots.

During Earl Siward's invasion of Scotland in 1054, Osbern Pentecost was one of the Normans killed at the Battle of Dunsinane, Siward's great defeat of the Scots.

References

Notes

Sources
Bannister, Arthur Thomas, The history of Ewias Harold, its castle, priory, and church (Hereford 1902)
Florence of Worcester, Chronicon ex chronicis ed. Thorpe, B. (London 1848)

11th-century births
1054 deaths
Anglo-Normans
Scoto-Normans
Norman warriors